Sarang is the helicopter air display team of the Indian Air Force that flies four modified HAL Dhruv helicopters, also known as Advanced Light Helicopter (ALH). The team was formed in October 2003 and their first performance was at the Asian Aerospace show, Singapore, in 2004. The name  is symbolic; the peacock is the national bird of India. The unit was inducted as No. 151 Helicopter Unit in 2005 and was shifted from Yelahanka AFS, Bangalore to Sulur AFS, Coimbatore in 2009.

Performances

The first public display using two IAF (ALH Evaluation Flight at ASTE) HAL Dhruv aircraft were at Aero India in Feb 2003 at Bangalore, led by Sqn Ldr Ajay Singh Pathania. Later in 2003, the Sarang unit was formally organised as a three-helicopter display team. In 2004, the team started performing with four helicopters at the Singapore Air Show in 2004. The team performs regularly at Aero India, a biennial air show held at Yelahanka Air Force Station near Bangalore, and on Air Force Day, the anniversary of the Indian Air Force, at Hindon Air Force Base every 8 October. The unit also performed at Farnborough Airshow in 2008. 2021 Dubai Airshow

Incidents
In February 2007, the team had its first fatal accident when a Dhruv crashed at Yelahanka Air Force Station during a rehearsal before Aero India. Co-pilot Squadron Leader Priyesh Sharma was killed instantly and the pilot Wing Commander Vikas Jaitley received serious head injuries.

See also
Surya Kiran
Sagar Pawan

References

External links

Sarang video
Sarang at the Asian Aerospace Show, 2004
Indian peacocks strut their stuff, Aviation International News
Image of Sarang helicopter
Aero-India 2007, Sarang Helicopter Display Team, www.Bharat-Rakshak.com
Aerobatics Aero-India 2007
Government of India - Press Information Breau release
"The Hindu" newspaper article: Sarang's aerial ballet

Indian Air Force
Aerobatic teams